Barrackpore (Station Code: BP) is a railway station in North 24 Parganas district in the Indian state of West Bengal, which serves the city of Barrackpore. It lies on the Sealdah–Ranaghat line and is part of the Kolkata Suburban Railway system and is under the jurisdiction of Eastern Railway.

History
The Sealdah–Kusthia line of the Eastern Bengal Railway was opened to railway traffic in the year 1862. Eastern Bengal Railway used to work only on the eastern side of the Hooghly River. Barrackpore has been serviced by rail since 1862.

Route
It takes about 35–40 minutes by suburban train to reach Barrackpore from Sealdah. As they are located in a suburban region of Kolkata, most municipalities of Barrackpore are connected by local train with Kolkata. The Sealdah–Ranaghat line runs through this sub-division and connects to Bongaon, Dankuni, Howrah, Burdwan, and Bandel. It is part of the Kolkata Suburban Railway system. The Circular and Metro Railways of Kolkata also offer an accessible means of transit to and from the sub-division.

Station complex
The platform is very much well sheltered. It has many facilities including water and sanitation. There is a proper approach road to this station. It is in proximity to the BT Road.

Electrification
The Sealdah–Ranaghat sector was electrified in 1963–65. Barrackpore was included in that sector.

Barrackpore Racecourse railway station
There used to be a branch line originating from Barrackpore station (code : BPPS) that served the Barrackpore Cantonment area. Barrackpore had a race course behind the criminal court and a special single rail track took steam engine-driven trains there, carrying British passengers who would attend the race. The line has been depreciated since and the Barrackpore Racecourse railway station is  used by the Indian Army only.

Gallery

References

External links

BP/Barrackpore (5 PFs) India Rail Info
Trains from Barrackpore to Sealah India Rail Info
Trains from Sealdah to Barrackpore India Rail Info

Railway stations in North 24 Parganas district
Sealdah railway division
Barrackpore
Kolkata Suburban Railway stations